The following are the association football events of the year 1963 throughout the world.

Notable events
Copa Libertadores 1963: Won by Santos FC after defeating Boca Juniors on an aggregate score of 5–3.
May 1 – Persipura Jayapura association football club is founded in Indonesia.
May 22 – A.C. Milan defeats Benfica, 2–1, to win their first European Cup.
September 25 – Dutch side Willem II Tilburg makes its European debut with a draw (1–1) on home soil against Manchester United in the first round of the Cup Winners Cup.
1963 International Soccer League
League: West Ham United defeated Gornik Zabrze, 2–1 on aggregate.
Cup: FK Dukla Prague defeated West Ham United, 2–1, on aggregate.
West Germany is one of the last countries in Europe to form a national league, Bundesliga, Germany's primary football competition. 
Dortmund's Konietzka scored the first ever goal in the Bundesliga in 1963.

Winners club national championship
 : Independiente
 : Santos
 : SC Motor Jena
 : Everton
 : AS Monaco
 : KR
 : Inter Milan
 : Oro
 : PSV Eindhoven
 : Brann
 : Rangers
 : Real Madrid
 : IFK Norrköping
 : Galatasaray
 : Borussia Dortmund

International tournaments
1963 British Home Championship (October 20, 1962 – April 6, 1963)

 Pan American Games in São Paulo, Brazil (April 20 – May 4, 1963)
 
 
 
 African Cup of Nations in Ghana (November 22 – December 1, 1963)

Births

 January 1
Alberigo Evani, Italian footballer and manager
Dražen Ladić, Croatian footballer and manager
 January 26 – José Mourinho, Portuguese manager
 March 11 – Hugo González, Chilean footballer
 March 13 – Aníbal González, Chilean footballer
 March 30 – Willem Brouwer, Dutch footballer
 April 7 – Bernard Lama, French international footballer
 April 15 – Walter Casagrande, Brazilian international footballer
 May 8 – Jan de Jonge, Dutch footballer and manager
 July 30 – Carlos Maldonado, Venezuelan footballer
 July 30 – Neil Webb, English footballer
 September 17 – Nicolás Navarro, Mexican footballer
 September 19 – David Seaman, English international footballer
 September 29 – Claudio Tello, Chilean international footballer (died 2014)
 October 12 – Mabi de Almeida, Angolan football coach (died 2010)
 October 12 – Alan McDonald, Northern Irish international footballer (died 2012)
 October 20 – Stan Valckx, Dutch footballer
 November 5 – Jean-Pierre Papin, French international footballer
 November 18 – Peter Schmeichel, Danish international footballer
 November 21 – Peter Bosz, Dutch footballer and manager
 November 27 – Roland Nilsson, Swedish footballer
 December 4 – Mike Snoei, Dutch footballer and manager
 December 11 – Mario Been, Dutch footballer and manager

Deaths

January 
 January 1 – Luiz Gervazoni, Brazilian defender, squad member at the 1930 FIFA World Cup. (56)

June 
June 3 – Dick MacNeill (65), Dutch footballer (born 1898)

References

 
Association football by year